This is a list of the top-selling albums in New Zealand for 2018 from the Official New Zealand Music Chart's end-of-year chart, compiled by Recorded Music NZ. Recorded Music NZ also published a list for the top 20 albums released by New Zealand artists.

Chart
Key
 – Album of New Zealand origin

Top 20 albums by New Zealand artists

Notes

References

2018 in New Zealand music
2018 record charts
Albums 2018